Rubin James Wilson (born 8 October 2001) is an English footballer who plays for Western League Premier Division side Saltash United, as a forward.

Career
Wilson made his first team debut on his 18th birthday, 8 October 2019, coming on as a sub in an EFL Trophy match between Plymouth Argyle and Swindon Town. He replaced Antoni Sarcevic in the 78th minute.

Wilson had been set to start the 2020–21 season with Plymouth Parkway in the Western League Premier Division. However, FA regulations prevent a professional from playing below step four of the National League System, and so he joined Dorchester on three-month loan.

Wilson was released by the Pilgrims at the end of the 2020–21 season.

References

Living people
2001 births
English footballers
Plymouth Argyle F.C. players
Association football forwards